Ambalapaiso II is a rural municipality located in the Atsinanana region of eastern Madagascar.  It belongs to the Marolambo District.

The majority of its inhabitants are Betsimisaraka.

4 Fokontany (villages) belong to this municipality: Ambalapaiso II, Ambatomitsangana, Ambohimalaza and Ambatomasina.

The municipality was created by splitting the former commune into two after the last communal elections: Ambodivoahangy and Ambalapaiso II. 
The surface of these municipalities had not yet been determined.

References

Populated places in Atsinanana